Ronald Thomas Harris (born June 30, 1942) is a Canadian former professional ice hockey player who played 476 games in the National Hockey League.  He played for the Detroit Red Wings, Oakland Seals, Atlanta Flames, and New York Rangers.

On January 13, 1968, Harris, playing with the Oakland Seals against the Minnesota North Stars, was involved in the accident that caused the death of Bill Masterton. Harris is still plagued with memories of the incident to this day and has conducted only one interview on this subject, with the St. Paul Pioneer Press in 2003, in which he stated, "It bothers you the rest of your life. It wasn't dirty and it wasn't meant to happen that way. Still, it's very hard because I made the play. It's always in the back of my mind."

After Harris retired from the NHL, he began getting involved in other areas of the game, coaching the Windsor Spitfires and Spokane Flyers at the major junior level, and later working as an assistant coach for the Quebec Nordiques in the NHL.

Career statistics

External links

1942 births
Living people
Atlanta Flames players
Cincinnati Wings players
Detroit Red Wings players
Canadian ice hockey defencemen
Hamilton Red Wings (OHA) players
Kamloops Junior Oilers coaches
Memphis Wings players
New York Rangers players
Oakland Seals players
Pittsburgh Hornets players
Quebec Nordiques coaches
San Francisco Seals (ice hockey) players
Spokane Flyers (junior) coaches
Ice hockey people from Montreal
Canadian ice hockey coaches